Thalolam may refer to:
 Thalolam (film), a 1998 Malayalam movie
 Thalolam (scheme), a social security scheme by the Government of Kerala
 Thalolam kunje, a Mappila song in Malayalam language